Lino César Oviedo Sánchez is a Paraguayan politician. He is a member of the Senate of Paraguay for the National Union of Ethical Citizens (UNACE) since 2008. He is the nephew of Lino César Oviedo Silva, usually known as Lino Oviedo; the elder Oviedo was the former leader of UNACE, and a divisive political figure in Paraguay.

Oviedo Sánchez became the presidential candidate of UNACE in the April 2013 elections when his uncle Oviedo Silva was killed in a helicopter accident on 2 February 2013. He ended up receiving only 0.8% of the vote.

References

External links
  Official page at Senate of Paraguay

Living people
Members of the Senate of Paraguay
National Union of Ethical Citizens politicians
Year of birth missing (living people)